Zsolt Borhi is a Hungarian sprint canoer who competed in the mid-1990s. He won a gold medal in the K-1 500 m event at the 1994 ICF Canoe Sprint World Championships in Mexico City.

Awards
 Hungarian canoer of the Year (2): 1993, 1994

References

Hungarian male canoeists
Living people
Year of birth missing (living people)
ICF Canoe Sprint World Championships medalists in kayak
20th-century Hungarian people